Rhonda Gaye Butler is an American politician and businesswoman serving as a member of the Louisiana House of Representatives from the 38th district. She assumed office on January 13, 2020.

Early life and education 
Butler was born and raised in Turkey Creek, Louisiana and attended Bayou Chicot High School in nearby Ville Platte. She graduated from the Bolton Beauty College.

Career 
Outside of politics, Butler operates Butler & Company Tree and Storm Recover and Gobble Gully Paint Ball. She was elected to the Louisiana House of Representatives in January 2020. In November 2020, Butler sponsored legislation that would require the Louisiana Department of Health to set rules granting family members increased access to residents of nursing homes and other adult residential care facilities. In May 2021, Butler was one of 48 House members who voted against a bill that would tax the sale of marijuana in Louisiana, effectively killing efforts to legalize recreational marijuana in the state.

References 

Living people
People from Evangeline Parish, Louisiana
Republican Party members of the Louisiana House of Representatives
Women state legislators in Louisiana
Year of birth missing (living people)